Bally is a neighbourhood in the city of Howrah of Howrah district in the Indian state of West Bengal. It is a part of the area covered by Kolkata Metropolitan Development Authority (KMDA).

Bally is under the jurisdiction of Bally Police Station of Howrah City Police. It is governed by the Bally Municipality.

Geography
It has an average elevation of 15 metres (49 feet). It is more elevated in the west than the east (where flows the Hoogly river), thus leading to a problem of water logging. Bally is separated from Uttarpara, Hooghly by Bally Canal (Bally Khal) at its north. A Bridge was constructed over Bally Canal in 1846 to join the two localities.

Transport
An important transportation hub of Kolkata, Bally is connected to Dakshineswar, Kolkata via Vivekananda Setu and Nivedita Setu. State Highway 6/ Grand Trunk Road and Belghoria Expressway also pass through Bally. From here, people can avail a number of buses to go to Kolkata (via Vivekananda Setu), Howrah (via National Highway 16) and Hooghly (via National Highway 19).

Bus Services

There are many bus routes connecting Bally with Kolkata and Hooghly region.

54- Ballykhal to Esplanade

51- Pardankuni to Howrah Station

56- Ruiyapurbopara to Howrah Station

Rt-10 (Mini)-  Ballykhal to Kidderpore

3- Serampore to Bagbazar/Salt Lake

285- Serampore to Newtown

2- Chuchura to Dakshineshwar

Belurmath to Garia station

DN2- Rajchandrapur to Barasat

AC50 - Belurmath to Garia

79- Panchla to Dunlop

AC50A- Rajchandrapur to Garia

AC23A- Rajchandrapur to Karunamoyee

C23- Dankuni to Park Circus

Dankuni to Kamalgazai

Ballyhalt to Kashipur

Ballyhalt to Karunamoyee

Haroa to Dankuni

S23A- Ballyhalt to Karunamoyee

26C- Jagatbhallavpur to Bonhooghly

26- Champadanga to Bonhooghly

DN 8/1- Tikiapara to Barasat

81/1-  Rajchandrapur to Barasat

Bagnan to Shyambazar

DN 46-  Dankuni to Karunamoyee

Barrackpore to Salap

Nimdighi to Madhyamgram

Salap to Nagerbazar

Railway Stations

Bally also has three railway stations of Kolkata Suburban Railway. They are Bally railway station (on Howrah-Bardhaman main line and Howrah-Bardhaman chord line), Bally Ghat railway station and Bally Halt railway station (on Sealdah-Dankuni line).

Airport

Nearest Airport of Bally is Netaji Subhas Chandra Bose International Airport in Dumdum, Kolkata.

Municipality
It is governed by the Bally Municipality.

See also
Bally Municipality
Belur Math
Kaleshwar Mandir
Liluah
Vivekananda Setu

References

Cities and towns in Howrah district
Neighbourhoods in Howrah
Neighbourhoods in Kolkata
Kolkata Metropolitan Area